Fria liberaler i Svenska kyrkan (FiSK, note 'fisk' is the Swedish word for 'fish')  is a nominating group of liberals that work within the Church of Sweden. FiSK is an organizationally autonomous network, previously linked to the party Folkpartiet, but since early 2013 independent from that party. The president of FiSK is Olov Lindquist.

External links
https://frialiberalerisvenskakyrkan.se/

Nominating groups in Church of Sweden politics
Liberals (Sweden)